Andre or André is a French surname. Notable people with the surname include:

 Alix André (1909-2000), French romance novelist
 André André (born 1989), Portuguese footballer
 Annette Andre (born 1939), Australian actor
 António André (born 1957), Portuguese footballer
 Benjamin André (born 1990), French footballer
 Carl Andre (born 1935), minimalist sculptor
 Dores André, Spanish ballet dancer
 Édouard André (1833–1894), French art collector
 Édouard André (1840–1911), French landscape architect
 Émile André (1871–1933), French architect
 Eric Andre (born 1983), American comedian
 Florent André (born 1991), French footballer
 Fred André (1941–2017), Dutch footballer and football manager
 Johanna André (1861–1926), German soprano and voice teacher
 John André (1750–1780), British officer hanged as a spy during the American Revolution
 John André (1923–1976), American baseball player
 Louis André (1838–1913), French General and Minister of War
 Mark Andre (born 1964), French composer
 Maurice André (1933–2012), French trumpeter
 Michel André (mathematician) (1936–2009), Swiss mathematician
 Michel André (bobsleigh) (born 1970), French bobsledder
 Peter Andre (born 1973), Australian singer
 Pierre Andre (born 1985), Malaysian actor.
 Pierre-Yves André (born 1974), French footballer
 Soraia André (born 1964), Brazilian judoka
 Yves André (born 1959), French mathematician

See also
 Andree (surname)
 Fabrizio De André (1940–1999), Italian singer-songwriter

French-language surnames
Patronymic surnames